Nikola Babić (5 December 1905 – 22 October 1974) was a Croatian footballer.

International career
He made his debut for Yugoslavia in an April 1928 friendly match against Turkey and earned a total of 3 caps scoring no goals. His final international was a May 1932 friendly away against Portugal.

References

External links
 
 

1905 births
1974 deaths
People from Lika-Senj County
Association football forwards
Yugoslav footballers
Yugoslavia international footballers
Croatian footballers
HŠK Građanski Zagreb players
SK Rapid Wien players
HAŠK players
HŠK Concordia players
Yugoslav expatriate footballers
Expatriate footballers in Austria
Yugoslav expatriate sportspeople in Austria